The 1960 Nebraska Cornhuskers football team was the representative of the University of Nebraska and member of the Big Eight Conference in the 1960 NCAA University Division football season. The team was coached by Bill Jennings and played their home games at Memorial Stadium in Lincoln, Nebraska.

Before the season
The mixed fortunes of Nebraska football under coach Jennings were a continuing source of uncertainty.  In the three previous years of his tenure, two distinct faces of the program appeared depending often upon who the opponent was.  Stunning victories over favored teams were frequently followed or preceded by demoralizing losses to underperforming or average conference foes.  Jennings had record clear losing records in all three seasons, finishing last or 2nd to last in the league, yet managed to secure epic wins against powerhouse rivals such as Minnesota and Pittsburgh, and even snapped Oklahoma's 13-year, 74-game conference winning streak.  For his fifth year, the Nebraska football schedule opened with a tough road game against #4 Texas, but was then favorable with four straight home stands, and the only other major looming threat was the final game with Oklahoma, in Norman.

Schedule

Roster

Starters

Coaching staff

Game summaries

Texas

Nebraska's record of surprise victories was extended once again when the Cornhuskers fought #4 Texas to a near draw, scraping out the win by a single point under the guidance of Pat Fischer, who had converted to QB in the offseason.  Nebraska set a new team record for defeat of a highly ranked team, besting the 14–13 road win over #7 Kansas in 1952.  The win moved the Cornhuskers to 2–1 in the series, and prompted the AP Poll to move Nebraska into the rankings for the first time since 1954.

Minnesota

Minnesota had long dominated the series between these teams, and was coming off the uncommon loss to Nebraska when they met in Lincoln.  The Cornhuskers failed to live up to their recent billing as the #12 team in the land, as the unranked Golden Gophers ran over around and through the outgunned Nebraska line.  The 14 Cornhusker points were put up inside of two minutes of the third quarter, one thanks to an interception, but the rest of the day belonged to Minnesota.  The Cornhuskers gave up their short-lived appearance in the polls and were now just 6–29–2 in the series.  Minnesota used this win as a springboard, going on to finish the season ranked #1 as the AP national champions, though they subsequently lost to #6 Washington 7–17 in the 1961 Rose Bowl.

Iowa State

The first conference game for Nebraska started with promise, thanks to a high wind.  A Cyclone punt traveled for only twelve yards into the wind, giving the Cornhuskers favorable field position on the Iowa State 29 and quickly leading to a touchdown in the first quarter.  Following that, the Cyclones brought the score even with a touchdown before the break.  Try as they might to recover the lead, Nebraska was unable to get a score, while allowing Iowa State what would be the game-winning field goal.  Nebraska still dominated the series, 42–11–1.

Kansas State

Nebraska secured the first league victory against Kansas State thanks a great deal to three key running plays by HB Bennie Dillard that rolled up 43 yards to score two touchdowns and set up a third.  The Cornhusker triumph also snapped a three-game home field losing stretch to the Wildcats and moved Nebraska to 33–9–2 against Kansas State all time.

Army

The Cadets struck first with a field goal, and disaster soon followed when Army then recovered a Nebraska fumble on the Cornhusker 5 yard line and promptly converted it into Nebraska's first-ever touchdown against the Cadets.  Down 9–0, just two plays later, Nebraska QB Pat Fischer successfully faked a pass before running 64 yards to the Army 14, and soon enough the Cornhuskers were back in it, 9–7.  After the halftime break, another bit of trickery by Fischer allowed a 57-yard pass to HB Dillard for another touchdown.  The Cadet squad was far more productive than Nebraska on the day, snagging an interception, outyarding them 324–198, and tallying a first down advantage of 18–5.  Despite the battle of statistics favoring Army, two outstanding defensive stands by the Cornhuskers on the 5 yard line kept Army scoreless until time expired on a last-ditch Cadet pass play into the end zone that was knocked away and incomplete.  The win was Nebraska's first against Army in three attempts.

Colorado

Playing in the high altitude at Boulder, the Cornhuskers attempted to make a game of it, pulling up to a 6–6 tie in the second quarter.  Nebraska's momentum would be broken and never recovered shortly after when the Buffaloes returned a kickoff 95 yards for a touchdown to go ahead for good.  Finally, in the fourth quarter, the Cornhuskers had a chance to tie the game on two occasions, but came away empty-handed on both attempts.  Colorado's win brought them back to within a game of catching Nebraska in the series, at 9–10–0.

Missouri

Nebraska was nursing a 3–3 record, just 1–2 in the Big 8, when #5 Missouri came to Lincoln.  While Nebraska seemed, under the guidance of Bill Jennings, as a likely victor in a game no one would normally expect them to win, this matchup failed to follow the pattern of Cornhusker upsets.  The Tigers rolled over the Cornhusker line almost at will, rolling up 28 unanswered points.  As time waned, Missouri gave up a fumble that the Cornhuskers eventually managed to bring to the Tiger 7-yard line.  Forced to turn the ball back over on downs, Missouri ran the clock out and handed down a shutout defeat to Nebraska.  The Tigers moved to 22–28–3 in the series, and kept the Missouri-Nebraska Bell for the fourth straight year.  The Tigers went on to finish the season 11–0 and ranked #5 by the AP Poll, and defeated #4 Navy 21–14 in the 1961 Orange Bowl.

Kansas

After the surprise 1959 upset of Oklahoma by the Cornhuskers in 1959, the Sooners had not yet recovered and were in a spiral downward.  Smelling a chance at a conference title for the first time in well over a decade, Kansas brought their full effort against the Cornhuskers in Lawrence.  Nebraska's first and only break came on a fumble lost by the Jayhawks early on, but the Kansas defense promptly stopped the series.  The Cornhuskers were unable to get past the Kansas 35 yard line until late in the 4th quarter when the game was already out of reach, and still the Jawhawks held firm.  The 0–31 blanking was the worst-ever defeat Kansas had dealt to Nebraska in their series that dated to 1892, though it still belonged to the Cornhuskers at 46–17–3.  Kansas went on to finish strong, 5–4–1 and ranked #11 by the AP Poll.

Oklahoma State

Oklahoma State and Nebraska were briefly members of the same conference from 1925 to 1928 before the MVIAA reorganized into the Big 6, though they had not met on the field before today.  Now that the Cowboys (formerly the Aggies) were back, the league was now known as the Big 8.  Coach Jennings showed a new look to first-time opponent OSU, attacking in the double wing T for the first time.  The Cowboys quickly adjusted, however, and were still able to stifle the Cornhusker offense.  Nebraska QB Pat Fischer returned an early punt for a touchdown to go ahead, but all other attempts to score fell short.  Nebraska succeeded in hanging onto the lead until late in the fourth, when Fischer allowed a fumble to be lost to Oklahoma State.  The Cowboys, who had managed to get into Nebraska territory only one other time in the entire game so far, subsequently converted the turnover into a touchdown.  The successful point after sealed the outcome.

Oklahoma

Oklahoma's 13-year high-flying domination of the league came crashing to a halt after Nebraska's shocking defeat of the Sooners to close out 1959, and Oklahoma had still not quite recovered.  Limping into the game with a 2–3–1 conference record unprecedented in recent history, the Sooners were bent on revenge against the team that had started the downward spiral.  Oklahoma jumped out to a 14–0 lead by halftime before Nebraska came together to mount a counterattack.  Holding the Sooners off for the rest of the game, and helped by a sensational 68 yard touchdown run, the Cornhuskers scratched up 17 points to take their second straight victory against Oklahoma.  The struggling Oklahoma squad ended their season with four straight conference defeats, and their series with Nebraska was again tied at 18–18–3.

After the season
Coach Jennings completed his fourth straight year of unpredictable levels of success.  Despite once again pulling off unlikely upsets, against Texas and Army, and defeating Oklahoma for the program's first back-to-back wins over the Sooners since 1942, the Cornhuskers again fell flat in the conference and managed only a tie for 6th place.  Although this was Coach Jennings' fourth straight losing season, he still managed to accumulate slightly improved records, with 6–19–0 (.240) in the Big 8 and 12–28–0 (.300) overall.  The Cornhuskers now stood at 152–77–12 (.656) all time in conference, and slipped to 363–217–34 (.619) overall, a record tenth straight year of decline.  Still, despite owning the third-worst career coaching in the history of the program among coaches with more than one year at the helm, the university opted to keep Jennings aboard for 1961.

Future professional players
Dennis Claridge, 1963 3rd-round pick of the Green Bay Packers
Pat Fischer, 1961 17th-round pick of the St. Louis Cardinals
 Bob Jones, 1964 18th-round pick of the Washington Redskins
Monte Kiffin, 1964 15th-round pick of the Minnesota Vikings
Ron McDole, 1961 4th-round pick of the St. Louis Cardinals
 Bill (Thunder) Thornton, 1963 5th-round pick of the St. Louis Cardinals
Mick Tingelhoff, Minnesota Vikings

References

Nebraska
Nebraska Cornhuskers football seasons
Nebraska Cornhuskers football